On May 10, 2013, Modern Family was renewed for a fifth season. The season premiered on September 25, 2013 and ended on May 21, 2014.

Cast

Main cast
 Ed O'Neill as Jay Pritchett 
 Sofía Vergara as Gloria Pritchett
 Julie Bowen as Claire Dunphy 
 Ty Burrell as Phil Dunphy 
 Jesse Tyler Ferguson as Mitchell Pritchett 
 Eric Stonestreet as Cameron Tucker 
 Sarah Hyland as Haley Dunphy 
 Ariel Winter as Alex Dunphy 
 Nolan Gould as Luke Dunphy 
 Rico Rodriguez as Manny Delgado
 Aubrey Anderson-Emmons as Lily Tucker-Pritchett

Recurring cast
 Adam DeVine as Andy Bailey
 Nathan Lane as Pepper Saltzman
 Christian Barillas as Ronaldo
 Reid Ewing as Dylan Marshall
 Dana Powell as Pam Tucker
 Celia Weston as Barb Tucker

Guest cast

 Justin Kirk as Charlie Bingham
 Andrew Daly as Principal Brown
 Diane Farr as Diane
 Spenser McNeil as Reuben
 Fred Willard as Frank Dunphy
 Jordan Peele as Derrick
 Ann Guilbert as Cameron's grandmother
 Elizabeth Peña as Pilar Ramirez
 John Benjamin Hickey as Dr. Clark
 Jane Krakowski as Dr. Donna Duncan
 Jesse Eisenberg as Asher
 Chazz Palminteri as Shorty
 Rob Riggle as Gil Thorpe
 John Heard as Gunther Thorpe
 Aisha Tyler as Wendy
 Will Sasso as Señor Kaplan
 Alyson Reed as Angela
 Marc Evan Jackson as Tad
 Patton Oswalt as Ducky
 Fred Armisen as Langham
 Stephen Merchant as Leslie Higgins
 Rhys Darby as Fergus Anderson
 Elizabeth Banks as Sal
 Barry Corbin as Merle Tucker
 Kevin Daniels as Longines
 Colin Hanlon as Steven

Production
The first episode of the season, "Suddenly, Last Summer", which premiered on ABC on September 25, 2013, made reference to the newly legalized same-sex marriage in California. The writers said that a wedding for Mitch and Cam was a "real possibility". In January 2014, it was announced that Modern Family's vacation episode would take place in Australia this season. The season was produced by Steven Levitan Productions and Picador Productions in association with 20th Century Fox Television, with creators Steven Levitan and Christopher Lloyd as showrunners.

Episodes

Reception

Reviews
The fifth season of Modern Family received mixed reviews from television critics. While episodes like "Larry's Wife", "Australia" and "Sleeper" were negatively received, others like "The Old Man & the Tree," "Las Vegas," and "Message Received" premiered to high acclaim, with the latter two frequently cited among the show's best episodes.

Reviewing the season's first eight episodes, Matthew Wolfson of Slant Magazine wrote that the show "appear[ed] to have finally arrived at the depressing and predictable low point toward which it [had] been trending for the past two years." He also went on to say that the show had "turned into a shrill pastiche of stereotypical characterizations and superficial banter lacking both feeling and wit", assigning it a rating of 1.5/4 stars. Different writers for The A.V. Club rated, in total, a majority of the former-half episodes with a "B−" grade or less. One writer for the magazine, Joshua Alston, gave "ClosetCon '13" a "C+" and remarked that "Modern Family becomes a high-wire act when it separates its characters into three storylines with no overlap between them." The second half was more warmly received, with three episodes rated an "A−" or higher. 

Despite the somewhat mixed reception for the season, Aubrey Anderson-Emmons's performance as Lily received positive reviews. In his review of "The Help", Joe Reid, writing for The A.V. Club, called Lily a "veritable one-liner machine". Reviewing the same episode, Leigh Raines of TV Fanatic said that the funniest part of the half-hour was "Lily at the end rolling her eyes and banging her head on the table listening to Cam, Mitchell and Pepper arguing over wedding plans".

Ratings

Awards and nominations

Primetime Emmy Awards
The fifth season received ten nominations at the 66th Primetime Emmy Awards in total, including its fifth consecutive nomination for Outstanding Comedy Series. The ceremony for the Primetime Awards aired on August 25, 2013 on NBC while the Primetime Creative Arts Awards took place on August 16, 2013.

References

External links
 Episode recaps at ABC.com
 

2013 American television seasons
2014 American television seasons
5